Cryptosepalum is a genus of flowering plants in the family Fabaceae. There are 12 species, mostly trees. They are native to Africa.

Species
Species include:
 Cryptosepalum ambamense
 Cryptosepalum congolanum
 Cryptosepalum diphyllum
 Cryptosepalum elegans
 Cryptosepalum exfoliatum
 Cryptosepalum katangense
 Cryptosepalum korupense
 Cryptosepalum maraviense
 Cryptosepalum mimosoides
 Cryptosepalum minutifolium
 Cryptosepalum pellegrinianum
 Cryptosepalum staudtii
 Cryptosepalum tetraphyllum

References

External links
 
 
 Cryptosepalum at Tropicos

 
Detarioideae
Fabaceae genera
Taxonomy articles created by Polbot
Afrotropical realm flora